Francis Fane may refer to:

Francis Fane, 1st Earl of Westmorland (1580–1629), Member of Parliament and English peer
Francis Fane of Fulbeck (disambiguation)
Sir Francis Fane (Royalist) (c. 1611–1681?), son of Francis Fane, 1st Earl of Westmorland
Sir Francis Fane (dramatist) (died 1691), grandson of Francis Fane, 1st Earl of Westmorland, English Restoration dramatist
Francis Fane, 12th Earl of Westmorland (1825–1891), British soldier and racehorse owner
Francis Fane of Brympton (died 1757), MP for Taunton 1727–1741, Petersfield 1741–1747, Ilchester 1747–1754 and Lyme Regis 1754–1757
Francis Fane of Spettisbury (1752–1813), MP for Lyme Regis 1777–1780 and Dorchester 1790–1807
Francis Fane (Royal Navy officer) (1778–1844), Royal Navy officer
Francis Fane (soldier) (1824–1893), English officer in the British Army
Frank Fane (1897–1980), Canadian politician